The South African Labour Party, was a South African political party formed in March 1910 in the newly created Union of South Africa following discussions between trade unions, the Transvaal Independent Labour Party, and the Natal Labour Party.  It was a professedly democratic socialist party representing the interests of the white working class.

The party received support mostly from urban white workers and for most of its existence sought to protect them from competition from black and other non-white workers.

History
The party was represented in the South African House of Assembly from the South African general election, 1910 until it lost its last seats in the South African general election, 1958. It never came close to acquiring a majority in Parliament or to being the official opposition, but it did spend periods as a junior coalition partner in the government of South Africa. Between 1910 and 1929 the Party was led by Colonel F. H. P. Creswell.

The worldwide depression after the end of the First World War had led to a strike in South Africa, known as the Rand Rebellion, which had been defused through a combination of military force and repression, including the imprisonment of Labour leader Frederic Creswell for a month. The government's heavy handed negotiations with the out-gunned unions earned Jan Smuts the enmity of the labour vote and the Labour Party, whose support was boosted by the growing militancy of workers. This paved the way for an election agreement between the Labour Party and the National Party (NP) for the 1924 general election, in which the two parties would not oppose each other during the election and would support each other's candidates in certain constituencies. The alliance resulted in a coalition government known as the Pact. The Labour Party provided two members of the Pact government, including its leader, Creswell, as Minister of Defence. In the event, Creswell remained in office until 1933, for much of that time doubling as Minister of Labour. While serving in government, the LP initiated important economic and industrial legislation which improved conditions for white workers. In addition, the LP also helped to alleviate unemployment amongst whites, and a year after becoming labour minister, Creswell claimed that he had found employment for 12,000 previously jobless whites. These policies, however, did nothing to enhance conditions for black workers.

In 1928 the party split between two factions. The Labour MP who was Minister of Posts, Telegraphs and Public Works, Walter Madeley, recognised the Industrial and Commercial Workers' Union, which had non-white members. This angered the National Party. As a result, Madeley was asked to resign. When the Labour Party National Council refused to agree, the Minister could only be got rid of by the resignation and reconstruction of the whole Pact government. The "Creswell Labour" group, supporting the veteran party leader Colonel Creswell, remained in the Pact government. The opposing faction, known as "National Council Labour", went into opposition with Madeley as its leader.

After the South African general election, 1929, even though the National Party won an overall majority, Colonel Creswell and a colleague remained ministers. When the National Party formed a coalition with Jan Smuts's South African Party, in 1933, the Pact government came to an end. At the South African general election, 1933, the Creswell faction became followers of General Smuts, thus leaving the National Council faction as the Labour Party.

The National Party and the South African Party merged in 1934 as the United Party (UP). When that party split, over the issue of South African participation in the Second World War, the Labour Party participated in a wartime coalition under the Premiership of Jan Smuts formed in 1939. Walter Madeley, the Labour leader, left the coalition in 1945.

On 24 July 1946, Walter Madeley resigned from the leadership and the party. Three other MPs also left the party during 1946–47 because they favoured a more conservative line on racial questions than the party organisation. Madeley, who had represented Benoni in the Union Parliament continuously since it was created in 1910, died in 1947. A dissident Labour candidate (representing the United Labour Party) contested the Benoni by-election, but lost by 949 votes to the official Labour candidate. Dissident Labour candidates also contested the South African general election, 1948 but won no seats.

After 1939, the Labour Party was clearly closer to the United Party than to the National Party. Labour had an electoral pact with the UP in 1943, 1948 and 1953. However Labour tended to oppose the NP, after it came to power in 1948, more vigorously than the larger and more conservative United Party felt able to do.

The Labour leader, John Christie, died during the South African general election, 1953. His successor, the last Labour leader Alex Hepple, tried to pursue a socialist policy as well as maintaining relations with groups like the African National Congress. His policies proved to be far too left-leaning for the majority Afrikaner-electorate and led a sound defeat in the 1958 election, in which Labour gained 0,23% of the votes and lost all of its remaining seats. The Labour Party was dissolved soon after the election.

A small fraction of former Labour politicians formed the Conservative Workers Party, which only gained 0.31% in the elections 1961 and disbanded as well.

Leaders
 1910–1933 Colonel F.H.P. Creswell (disputed 1928–1933)
 1928–1946 Walter Madeley (disputed 1928–1933)
 1946–1953 John Christie
 1953–1958 Alex Hepple

Electoral history

House of Assembly elections

References 
 Keesing's Contemporary Archives
 Smuts: A Reappraisal, by Bernard Friedman (George, Allen & Unwin 1975) 
 South Africa 1982 Official Yearbook of the Republic of South Africa, published by Chris van Rensburg Publications

1910 establishments in South Africa
Defunct political parties in South Africa
Social democratic parties in South Africa
Labour parties
Organisations associated with apartheid
Political parties disestablished in 1958
Political parties established in 1910
White South African culture
Working class in South Africa
Social class in South Africa